Bonini is an Italian surname. Notable people with the surname include:

Alexander Bonini (c. 1270 – 1314), Italian Franciscan philosopher
Antonio Bonini (born 1954), Italian volleyball player
Colin Bonini (born 1965), American politician
Francesco Maria Bonini (1865–1930), Italian opera singer
Giovanni Bonini, 14th-century Italian painter
Giovanni Bonini (footballer) (born 1986), Sammarinese footballer
Giuseppe Bonini, Italian middle-distance runner
Girolamo Bonini (died 1680), Italian Baroque painter
Massimo Bonini (born 1959), Sammarinese footballer and manager
Nancy Bonini (born 1959), American neuroscientist and geneticist
Oscar Bonini (born 1959), Argentine rower
Severo Bonini (1582–1663), Italian classical composer, organist and music theorist

Italian-language surnames